The men's 100 metres was a track and field athletics event held as part of the Athletics at the 1904 Summer Olympics programme. 11 athletes from 3 nations participated. The competition was held on September 3, 1904. The event was won by Archie Hahn of the United States, completing his sprint trifecta (having already won the 60 metres and 200 metres) and marking the third straight gold medal in the event by an American. Hahn would later repeat his win in the now-unofficial 1906 Intercalated Games. The United States swept the medals.

Background

This was the third time the event was held. None of the previous runners competed in 1904. American Archie Hahn, had won the 1903 U.S. and Canadian championships; he had also taken the 60 metres and 200 metres titles earlier in the 1904 Olympics. He was heavily favored. 

The 1904 competition was one of only two Olympic Games (along with 1900) where the men's 100 metres was not the shortest sprint, with the 60 metres being held in those two years.

Canada was represented in the event for the first time. Hungary was the only other country, aside from the host, to send a runner; this made the United States and Hungary the only two nations to have appeared at each of the first three Olympic men's 100 metres events.

Competition format

With fewer entrants than in 1900, the event was reduced from four rounds to two: heats and a final. The top two runners in each heat advanced to the final.

Records

These were the standing world and Olympic records (in seconds) prior to the 1904 Summer Olympics.

(*) unofficial

Results

Heats

The top two finishers in each heat advanced to the final.

Heat 1

Heat 2

Heat 3

Final

Hahn opened quickly, reaching a sizable lead within the first 20 metres. Cartmell started slowly and was in last place at 40 metres, almost halfway through the race, before finishing well and placing second.

Results summary

Sources

 

Athletics at the 1904 Summer Olympics
100 metres at the Olympics